Egypt: The Eternal Smile: Reflections on a Journey is a 1980 non-fiction coffee table book by Allen Drury. It is a travelogue of a trip through Egypt undertaken by Drury and photographer Alex Gotfryd.

Overview
Egypt: The Eternal Smile chronicles a journey between Abu Simbel and Alexandria, with Drury's observations punctuated by Gotfryd's photographs. Drury provides a wealth of information about ancient Egyptian history, culture, and religion.

Critical reception
Noting Drury's "highly vivid, personal impressions", Diana Loercher wrote in The Christian Science Monitor:

References

1980 non-fiction books
Coffee table books
American travel books
Books about Egypt
Abu Simbel